William Lee Nichols (born 1940) is an American guitarist and soul songwriter from Carrollton, Mississippi.

Early years 
Nichols was one of nine children born to Laura Bell and Tom Sanders. Sanders was a farmer who played blues guitar in his spare time. Inspired by his father and blues musicians he heard on the radio, Nichols taught himself guitar.

Aged 14, Nichols' family moved to Springfield, Massachusetts where Nichols played with various bands including a gospel group named The Bells of Harmony.

In 1963, Nichols joined Jimmy Vick and The Victors and recorded a single. The group were mentioned in Billboard and got some local radio airplay but by November, the group broke up.

Career 
In 1964, Nichols moved to Detroit and stayed with his uncle. He was hired by Motown Records where his first job was playing with Martha and the Vandellas. Nichols was also in the Motown Road Band led by Choker Campbell. In 1965 he became the musical director for Marvin Gaye.

Nichols first break as a songwriter came in 1966 when Billy Stewart took Nichols to the Chess Records in Chicago to record his song "To Love, to Love".

Becoming disenchanted with constant touring, Nichols moved to New York to lead the house band at the Crystal Ballroom. Billy Nichols and the Soul Swingers played at the Crystal Ballroom for about three years.

In 1971, Nichols led rehearsals on Galt MacDermot's Two Gentlemen of Verona musical play. Nichols continued to compose and had his first Billboard top twenty hit in 1972 when Millie Jackson recorded "Ask Me What You Want".

Nichols most successful period came working with B.T. Express. "Do It (Til You're Satisfied)" recorded and released in 1974. Nichols went on to write and produce other songs for the group such as "Can't Stop Groovin'" and "Shout It Out".

At the end of the 1970s, Nichols produced two rap records: Jimmy Spicer - "The Adventures of Super Rhymes" (Dazz, 1979) and Count Coolout - "Rhythm Rap Rock" (Boss Records, 1980).

In 2002, singer Phil Collins covered one of his songs, "Can't Stop Loving You" on his album, Testify.

Legacy 
Rappers such as Will Smith, Beanie Sigel, EPMD, Master P, Ice Cube, P. Diddy, Jay-Z, Ludacris, Dr. Dre and De La Soul have sampled Nichols' music. A sample of his song "Do It", heard in the song entitled "Addictive" performed by recording artist Truth Hurts, won him two BMI awards for most urban airplay for the year 2002.

Discography 
 Shake A Leg (Sue, 1969)
 Treat Your Neighbor (Mercury 1970)
 Give Your Body up to the Music (West End Records, 1979)
 Diamond Ring (West End Records 1979)
 Whip Your Body (Whip It, Whip It, Whip It) (Boss Records)
 Love Stuff (Boss Records, 2003)
 One Day (At a Time) (Boss Records, 2014)

As sideman 
With Bernard Purdie
Purdie Good! (Prestige, 1971)
Stand By Me (Whatcha See Is Whatcha Get) (Mega, 1971)
Shaft (Prestige, 1971)
Soul Is... Pretty Purdie (Flying Dutchman, 1972)

References

External links 
 Billy Nichols on Discogs
 Billy Nichols on AllMusic
 

1940 births
Living people
American soul guitarists
American multi-instrumentalists
Songwriters from Mississippi
People from Carrollton, Mississippi